The John Baynton House (a.k.a. "Williamsburg") is a historic house in Natchez, Adams County, Mississippi.

Location
It is located at number 821 on Main Street in Natchez, Mississippi.

History
The house was built for John Baynton, a land speculator, in 1833. The architectural style is Federal. It has one story and a half.

It was purchased by the Junkin family; one of their descendants is John R. Junkin, who served as the speaker of the Mississippi House of Representatives in the 1970s.

It has been added to the National Register of Historic Places since October 16, 1974.

References

Houses on the National Register of Historic Places in Mississippi
Houses in Natchez, Mississippi
Federal architecture in Mississippi
National Register of Historic Places in Natchez, Mississippi